is a 2009 Japanese drama film written and directed by Sion Sono. It screened at the 2009 New York Asian Film Festival.

Plot
Shiro's struggle with his father's cancer and impending death leads to a realization that he must communicate his love and admiration for him before it's too late. A series of flashbacks reveals their relationship over time, and the trouble Shiro faced connecting to his strict father who was also his teacher and soccer coach. With a consuming secret of his own, Shiro, now in his late 20s and about to get engaged, must eventually learn how to share it with his loved ones.

External links

Film details at JapanSociety
Official website

2000s Japanese-language films
2009 films
2009 drama films
Japanese drama films
Films about cancer
Films directed by Sion Sono
2000s Japanese films